Vanity Fair is a BBC television drama serial adaptation of William Makepeace Thackeray's 1848 novel of the same name broadcast in 1998. The screenplay was written by Andrew Davies.

The BBC had adapted the novel as a serial three times previously, in 1956, in 1967 and in 1987.

Plot summary
For a full-length summary of the book see: Vanity Fair plot summary.

Cast

 Natasha Little as Becky Sharp
 Frances Grey as Amelia Sedley
 David Ross as Mr. Sedley
 Philip Glenister as William Dobbin
 Michele Dotrice as Mrs. Sedley
 Janine Duvitski as Mrs. Bute Crawley
 Anton Lesser as Mr. Pitt Crawley
 Nathaniel Parker as Rawdon Crawley
 Jeremy Swift as Jos Sedley
 Tom Ward  as George Osborne
 Stephen Frost as Bute Crawley
 Tim Woodward as Mr. John Osborne
 Janet Dale as Miss Briggs
 Frances Tomelty as Mrs. O'Dowd
 Mark Lambert as Major O'Dowd
 David Bradley as Sir Pitt Crawley
 John Surman as Horrocks
 Miriam Margolyes as Miss Crawley
 Daniel Hart as Ensign Stubble
 Abigail Thaw as Jane Osborne
 Bryan Pringle as Raggles
 Linal Haft as Moss
 Eleanor Bron as Lady Bareacres
 Sarah Crowden  as Lady Blanche
 Graham Crowden as Lord Bareacres
 Sylvestra Le Touzel as Lady Jane Crawley
 Gerard Murphy as Lord Steyne
 Robert Cole  as Little Rawdon
 Zohren Weiss as Little Georgey

Awards
Won:
1999: Television and Radio Industries Club Awards - BBC Programme of the Year
1999: Banff Television Festival - Special Jury Prize
1999: Biarritz International Festival of Audiovisual Programming -  Best TV Series and Serials, Best Actress (Natasha Little), Screenplay

Nominated:
1999: British Academy Television Awards - Best Drama Serial, Best Actress, Best Costume Design, Best Editing, Best Original Music, Best Photography
1999: Royal Television Society Programme Awards - Actor: Female (Natasha Little)
1999: Royal Television Society Craft & Design Awards - Music - Original Score (Murray Gold)

References

External links
 Review - New York Times
 Review - BBC
 
 

1990s British drama television series
BBC television dramas
Television shows based on British novels
Television shows written by Andrew Davies
Films based on Vanity Fair (novel)
1998 British television series debuts
1998 British television series endings
Cultural depictions of George IV
English-language television shows